The Stillwater Dam is a hydroelectric dam on the Stillwater River in Old Town north of downtown Orono in Penobscot County, Maine. As a part of the Penobscot River restoration and the removal of the Great Works and Veazie dams, the Stillwater Dam and the Orono Dam will be upgraded to maintain previous levels of power generation.

References

Dams in Maine
Buildings and structures in Old Town, Maine
Hydroelectric power plants in Maine
Dams completed in 1937